Pálsson is a surname of Icelandic origin, meaning son of Páll (Paul). In Icelandic names, the name is not strictly a surname, but a patronymic. The name refers to:

Brooke Palsson, Canadian actress
Einar Pálsson (1925–1996), Icelandic scholar of Icelandic saga literature
Gísli Pálsson (contemporary), Icelandic professor of anthropology, author, and editor
Haukur Pálsson (born 1992), Icelandic basketball player
Hermann Pálsson (1921–2002), Icelandic language scholar and translator
Ögmundur Pálsson (c. 1475–1541), Icelandic Roman Catholic prelate
Sveinn Pálsson (fl. 18th century), Icelandic glaciologist and vulcanologist
Þorsteinn Pálsson (born 1947), Icelandic politician; Prime Minister of Iceland 1987–88
Victor Pálsson (born 1991), Icelandic footballer

Surnames
Icelandic-language surnames